The Movement of Unitarian Communists (MCU), or simply Unitarian Communists, was a communist political party in Italy.

History 
The party was founded in June 1995 as a split from the Communist Refoundation Party (PRC) by Communist MPs who had endorsed the vote of confidence in the government of Lamberto Dini (which was also supported by the Democratic Party of the Left, the Italian People's Party and Lega Nord) in March 1995.

Most members of the MCU were formerly of the Proletarian Unity Party (PdUP); the PdUP had merged with the Italian Communist Party (PCI) in 1984, only to leave it when the PCI abandoned communism and reformed as the Democratic Party of the Left (PDS) in 1991. At that time most ex-PdUP members joined the PRC.

The leading politicians who formed the MCU included Sergio Garavini, Lucio Magri, Luciana Castellina, Famiano Crucianelli, Luciano Pettinari, Ersilia Salvato, Rino Serri, Marida Bolognesi and Walter Bielli. 16 out of 57 PRC parliamentarians and 2 MEPs joined the MCU. In the 1996 general election, the MCU was part of The Olive Tree, and presented some candidates in the electoral lists of the PDS as "PDS – European Left".

In February 1998, the MCU and other small parties merged with the PDS to form the Democrats of the Left (DS).

References 

Defunct political parties in Italy
Political parties established in 1995
Defunct communist parties in Italy
Political parties disestablished in 1998
1995 establishments in Italy
1998 disestablishments in Italy